The 2012–13 Adelaide United W-League season was Adelaide United's fifth season in the W-League.

Players

Technical staff

League table

Fixtures

W-League

Kick-off times are in ACST/ACDT.

References

External links
 W-League website
 Adelaide United FC website

Adelaide United FC (A-League Women) seasons
Ade